Dalotia coriaria, the greenhouse rove beetle, is a species of staphylinid rove beetle in the subfamily Aleocharinae. It is used as a predatory biological control agent for the management of pest insects.

Biological control
Dalotia coriaria is a commercially available species, sold by several Integrated Pest Management companies in the US and Europe. The beetles are employed as a biological control agent of glasshouse pests. Both adults and larvae prey upon larvae of fungus gnats (Bradysia spp.), and adult beetles also target shore flies (Scatella spp.) and thrips. The species was discovered feeding on a laboratory culture of fungus gnats, stimulating a study into its efficacy as a biological control agent.

Use as a model organism

Dalotia'''s fast generation time, high fecundity and ease of culture of have recently led to the species being developed as a laboratory model organism.

Taxonomic history
Like many Aleocharinae, Dalotia coriaria has a complex taxonomic history. Initially described a member of Homalota, many authors placed it in the large genus Atheta, before its current placement in Dalotia''.

References

External links

Aleocharinae
Beetles of North America
Beetles of Europe
Beetles described in 1856